The 1972 National Challenge Cup was the 59th edition of the United States Soccer Football Association's annual open soccer championship. Teams from the North American Soccer League declined to participate.  Elizabeth S.C. defeated the San Pedro Yugoslavs in the final game.

Bracket

Final

External links
 1972 U.S. Open Cup – TheCup.us

Lamar Hunt U.S. Open Cup
U.S. Open Cup